Beatrice Atim Anywar (née Beatrice Atim), also Betty Anywar, (born 9 January 1964), is a Ugandan politician who serves as the Member of Parliament representing the Kitgum Municipality Constituency in the 10th Ugandan Parliament (2016 to 2021). Effective 14 December 2019, she concurrently serves as the State Minister for the Environment, in the Ugandan Cabinet. She replaced Dr. Mary Goretti Kitutu, who was appointed Minister of Energy and Minerals, in the same cabinet.

Background and education
She was born in Kitgum District, in the Acholi sub-region, in the Northern Region of Uganda, on 9 January 1964. In 1991, she graduated with an Advanced Diploma in Marketing, from Makerere University Business School. In 2004, she received a Bachelor of Public Administration degree from the Islamic University in Uganda. Her degree of Master of Public Administration and Management was awarded by Makerere University, the oldest and largest public university in Uganda. She also has a Certificate in Democracy and Good Governance, Obtained from Marquette University, in the United States.

Career before politics
For a period of over two years, from 1991 until 1993, Beatrice Anywar worked as the Depot Manager at a company called UFEL Uganda. Then for the next two years, 1994 and 1995, she worked as Senior Marketing Officer at Vitafoam Uganda Limited, a mattress manufacturing company. After that, she worked in the commercial customer care office of the National Water and Sewerage Corporation, serving there for eight years, from 1996 until 2004.

Political career
 In the FDC political party
She entered Uganda's elective politics by contesting for the Kitgum Municipality Constituency parliamentary seat in 2006. She was elected, defeating the National Resistance Movement candidate Santa Okot. She was appointed as the shadow minister for environment, during her first term in parliament, due to her environmental activism.

She became well known for her work to save the Mabira Forest in Uganda. The president Yoweri Museveni, and the government, had prior to her work decided to sell the forest to the sugar company Sugar Corporation of Uganda Limited (SCOUL) to cut it down and convert it into a sugar cane plantation for ethanol production. Atim fought along with for example the National Association of Professional Environmentalists to stop the felling, and organized a boycott of SCOUL's sugar.

In 2007, about 100,000 Ugandans demonstrated in a demonstration called the "Save Mabira Crusade" against the president and military to save the forest. Three people died and many were hurt. Atim Anywar's house was besieged by military and police, and she was imprisoned for terrorism.

 As an independent politician
During the 2016 parliamentary election cycle, Betty Anywar lost the Forum for Democratic Change primaries. She ran as an independent political candidate. She won the parliamentary seat, with a comfortable margin, beating several high-profile opponents.

In December 2017, during the parliamentary vote to remove presidential age limits, Beatrice Atim Anywar voted "Yes", to the chagrin of opposition politicians.

On 14 December 2019, she was named in the cabinet of Uganda as the minister of state for Environment; a position she was appointed to by the Head of State of Uganda Yoweri Kaguta Museveni.

See also
 Margaret Lamwaka Odwar
 Winnie Kiiza
 Cabinet of Uganda
 Cabinet of Rwanda

References

External links
Uganda MPs angry at forest plan, from BBC. Accessed on 26 December 2010.
Male inmates peep at naked women As of 24 May 2007.

1964 births
Living people
Acholi people
People from Kitgum District
People from Northern Region, Uganda
Members of the Parliament of Uganda
21st-century Ugandan women politicians
21st-century Ugandan politicians
Government ministers of Uganda
Independent politicians in Uganda
Makerere University alumni
Islamic University in Uganda alumni
Marquette University alumni
Women government ministers of Uganda
Forum for Democratic Change politicians
Women members of the Parliament of Uganda